Overhead line pylon may refer to:
 A transmission tower
 A traction current pylon